This is a list of United States ambassadors to Madagascar. The United States has maintained diplomatic relations since June 1960. The embassy in Tananarive (now Antananarivo) was established on June 26, 1960. Currently, the ambassador also serves US diplomatic interests or relations  to Comoros.

Ambassadors

Note: Embassy Tananarive (now Antananarivo) was established June 26, 1960.

Notes

See also
Madagascar – United States relations
Foreign relations of Madagascar
Ambassadors of the United States

References
United States Department of State: Background notes on Madagascar

External links
 United States Department of State: Chiefs of Mission for Madagascar
 United States Department of State: Madagascar
 United States Embassy in Antananarivo

Madagascar

Comoros–United States relations
United States